There are also several persons called Opperman, listed at Opperman (disambiguation)

S E Opperman was a tractor manufacturer in England. After he saw the Bond Minicar he decided to build his own four-wheel microcar at a factory in Elstree, Hertfordshire.

Unicar T
The first model was the Unicar T, designed by Lawrie Bond, and built between 1956 and 1959. It looked like a miniature two door saloon with 2+2 seating and was the cheapest car at the 1956 London Motor Show, but it was even cheaper if built as a kit when it could be had without engine for £170. A complete car cost £400. The body was made in fibreglass mounted on a steel tube chassis and had neither separate bonnet nor boot lid. The engine was placed in the middle of the rear seating area giving two small seats on either side of the engine. Since it had no differential for the rear wheels they were placed close together. The front suspension was independent using coil springs and struts and at the rear trailing arms were used. The brakes were mechanically operated. Some early models had a 322 cc Anzani engine. About 200 were made.

Stirling

The only other Opperman was the Stirling, but only two were made, built between 1958 and 1959. Much more stylish than the Unicar, the first had a larger 424 cc  Excelsior engine and the second had a Steyr 500 cc unit. The brakes were hydraulic and the rear wheels further apart. The launch of the Mini in 1959 wiped out the rationale for the Opperman and the Stirling never went into full production.

See also 
 Opperman Motocart

References

A–Z of Cars 1945–1970. Michael Sedwick and Mark Gillies. Bay View Books 1993. 
Auto-Parade. Publisher – Arthur Logoz, Zurich. 1958
Motor Cycle Data Book, Newnes, 1960

External links 
An Opperman in the Bruce Weiner Microcar Museum

Microcars
Mid-engined vehicles
Kit car manufacturers
Defunct motor vehicle manufacturers of England
Tractor manufacturers of the United Kingdom
Companies based in Hertsmere
Cars introduced in 1956